Bovinger  is a village in Essex, England.

References

Villages in Essex
Epping Forest District